Termitogeton umbilicatus, is a species of subterranean termite of the genus Termitogeton. It is endemic to Sri Lanka and can be seen in forests, plains, hills and human vegetation of higher elevations.

References

External links
TERMITOGETONINAE
Diversity and distribution of termite assemblages in montane forests in the Knuckles Region, Sri Lanka

Termites
Insects described in 1858
Insects of Sri Lanka